A by-election was held for the New South Wales Legislative Assembly electorate of Gundagai on 21 November 1884 because of the resignation of Bruce Smith, to return to Melbourne to run his father's business, WM Howard Smith and Sons Ltd.

Dates

Candidates
 James Watson had been the member for Lachlan and then Young until his defeat at the 1882 election, and had been the Colonial Treasurer in the Parkes - Robertson coalition ministry.

Jack Want was a barrister from Sydney and this was the first occasion he stood for parliament, although he would subsequently serve for 20 years in both houses of parliament, including three periods as Attorney General.

Want won the show of hands however a poll was demanded.

Result

				

Bruce Smith resigned.

See also
Electoral results for the district of Gundagai
List of New South Wales state by-elections

References

1884 elections in Australia
New South Wales state by-elections
1880s in New South Wales